State Route 161 (SR 161) is an east–west state highway in central Ohio. Its western terminus is in Mutual at State Route 29 and its eastern terminus is near Alexandria at State Route 37. State Route 161 passes through Columbus, the capital of Ohio, and a variety of towns including Plain City, Dublin, and New Albany.

The route was established in 1924 to connect Plain City and Dublin. It was later expanded to cover Mutual and Granville. Parts of SR 161 in Dublin and New Albany were upgraded to a freeway in 1969 and 1997.

Route description

SR 161 starts off in Mutual as Milford Road, at a T-intersection at SR 29. The road turns northeast and later meets SR 559 and Bullard Rutan Road in a 5-point intersection.  later, a concurrency begins with SR 4.  later, the concurrency ends with SR 4 continuing to move north. About  later, SR 38 starts a very short concurrency at Chuckery. After Chuckery, SR 38 splits off. There are no more major intersections until SR 161 reaches Plain City, where it meets U.S. Route 42 (US 42). SR 161 goes through Madison and a small section of Franklin County without major intersections. In Union County, it meets US 33 and Post Road in an interchange. SR 161 goes on the freeway and starts a concurrency. The concurrency goes back into Franklin County and into Dublin. In Dublin, the freeway has interchanges with Avery–Muirfield Drive and Interstate 270 (I-270). The freeway becomes an at-grade highway as it meets Post Road again.

The road goes into Dublin downtown and has intersections with SR 745 and SR 257. At SR 257, US 33 splits off and the concurrency ends. After that, there are no more major intersections until SR 161 reaches Worthington, as it meets SR 315 in a diamond interchange, and US 23 at an at-grade intersection. After the intersection at US 23, SR 161 enters Columbus. There is an intersection with SR 710 and an interchange with I-71.  later, in Minerva Park, SR 161 becomes a limited access freeway. The first exit is SR 3, a partial cloverleaf interchange with service roads.  later, SR 161 re-enters Columbus and meets I-270 again in a modified cloverleaf interchange. There is a SPUI-parclo hybrid interchange at Sunbury Road, and an incomplete interchange for Little Turtle Way, a half of a diamond interchange. The next two interchanges, Hamilton Road and New Albany Road, uses diamond interchanges. SR 161 enters New Albany, and has two interchanges with US 62, in Franklin County, and Beech Road, in Licking County. Then it exits New Albany and enters St. Albans Township. In the township, SR 161 has two diamond interchanges with SR 310 and SR 37. SR 161 ends at SR 37. SR 161 is part of the Big Darby Plains scenic byway. The parts of the route that are included in the byway are from Homer Road to Rosedale Road and from Kramer Road to US 33.

History

SR 161 was designated in 1924, as a connection from Plain City to Dublin. It was later expanded to include an unnumbered section between Mutual and Plain City, and Dublin and Granville. Much later, in 1969, the  section in Dublin was upgrade to a freeway. Seven years later, the section between I-71 and Sunbury Road was upgraded to a divided highway. SR 161's route was changed to use the bypass, no longer intersecting New Albany's downtown area. The project completed in 2000. The project finished in 2008. The freeway in New Albany was extended to SR 37, SR 161's eastern terminus. New interchanges and solutions were designed for the interchanges with I-270 and Avery-Muirfield Drive in Dublin, studies started for the interchanges in 2011 and phase one of the project started in 2014.

Junction list

State Route 161J

An unsigned state route named SR 161J previously existed in Licking County. It consisted of the former section of SR 161 before it was rerouted onto the nearby freeway. Beginning at a dead end near the SR 161–Beech Road interchange, it traveled east along Worthington Road and ended at Watkins Road (TR 42). It intersected SR 310, but never met SR 161. The route suffix "J" meant that the road was "awaiting abandonment". The route was ultimately abandoned by the state in 2013.

See also

References

External links

161
Transportation in Champaign County, Ohio
Transportation in Franklin County, Ohio
Transportation in Licking County, Ohio
Transportation in Madison County, Ohio
Transportation in Union County, Ohio
Dublin, Ohio